Fiori, Fiori, Fiori! is a 2020 Italian short film, written, produced, narrated and directed by Luca Guadagnino. It stars Maria Continella, Natalia Simeti, Claudio Gioè and David Kajganich.

It is scheduled to have its world premiere at the Venice Film Festival on September 5, 2020.

Plot

During the lockdown for the COVID-19 pandemic, the movie director Luca Guadagnino, with the help of a small crew, comes down to Sicily from Milan armed only with a smartphone and a tablet, to knock on the doors of his childhood friends and understand with them how they lived this exceptional moment that united the whole world.

Cast
 Maria Continella
 Natalia Simeti
 Claudio Gioè
 David Kajganich

References

External links
 

2020 films
2020 short films
Italian short films
Films directed by Luca Guadagnino
2020s Italian films